Clyde Jackman, (born December 21, 1954) is a former Canadian politician in Newfoundland and Labrador, Canada. He represented the district of Burin-Placentia West in the House of Assembly from 2003 until 2015 as a member of the Progressive Conservatives.

Jackman held several portfolios in the provincial cabinet including Minister of Education, Minister of Fisheries & Aquaculture, Minister of Tourism, Culture and Recreation, Minister of Environment and Conservation, and Minister of Seniors, Wellness and Social Development. Jackman did not seek re-election in the 2015 provincial election.

Controversy
Jackman came under attack in February 2011, when a report, by a committee put in place by the government, recommended that the Department of Fisheries and Aquaculture invest $450 million to downsize the commercial fishery. Jackman announced immediately that he would not to endorse the report because he felt it would not solve the problems in the fishery. Lorraine Michael, the leader of the New Democratic Party, called on Jackman to resign his post as minister.

Electoral history

|-

|-

|NDP
|Julie Mitchell
|align="right"|2498
|align="right"|47.69%
|align="right"|
|-

|Liberal
|Jacqueline Mullett
|align="right"|202
|align="right"|3.86%
|align="right"|
|}

|-

|-

|NDP
|Julie Mitchell
|align="right"|1704
|align="right"|32.14%
|align="right"|
|-

|Liberal
|George Brake
|align="right"|457
|align="right"|8.62%
|align="right"|
|}

|-

|-

|Liberal
|Sam Synard
|align="right"|2133
|align="right"|34.03%
|align="right"|-19.27%
|-

|NDP
|Wayne Butler
|align="right"|684
|align="right"|10.91%
|align="right"|-35.79%
|}

References

External links
 Clyde Jackman's PC Party biography

Members of the Executive Council of Newfoundland and Labrador
Progressive Conservative Party of Newfoundland and Labrador MHAs
Living people
1954 births
21st-century Canadian politicians